The following is a list of neighborhoods, districts and other places located in the city of Philadelphia, Pennsylvania. The list is organized by broad geographical sections within the city. 

Common usage for Philadelphia's neighborhood names does not respect "official" borders used by the city's police, planning commission or other entities.  Therefore, some of the places listed here may overlap geographically, and residents do not always agree where one neighborhood ends and another begins. Philadelphia has 41 ZIP-codes, which are often used for neighborhood analysis.

Historically, many neighborhoods were defined by incorporated townships (Blockley, Roxborough), districts (Belmont, Kensington, Moyamensing, Richmond) or boroughs (Bridesburg, Frankford, Germantown, Manayunk) before being incorporated into the city with the Act of Consolidation of 1854. Adding further complication is the fact that in some parts of Philadelphia, especially the central areas of North, West and South Philadelphia, residents have long been more likely to identify with the name of their section of the city than with any specific neighborhood name. Today, community development corporations, neighborhood watches and other civic organizations are influential in shaping the use of neighborhood names and approximate boundaries.

For planning purposes, the city is divided into 18 Planning Analysis Sections, which are Upper Far Northeast, Lower Far Northeast, Lower Northwest, Lower Southwest, University Southwest, West, West Park, Lower Northeast, River Wards, Lower North, North, Central, South, Lower South, Upper Northwest, Upper North, Central Northeast and North Delaware.

Center City

The Center City Planning Analysis Section extends from South Street on the south to Vine Street on the north and from the Delaware River on the east to the Schuylkill River on the west.

South Philadelphia

The South Philadelphia Planning Analysis Section is bounded by South Street on the north and the Delaware and Schuylkill Rivers to their confluence.

Southwest Philadelphia

Southwest Philadelphia (formerly Kingsessing Township) is a section of Philadelphia, Pennsylvania that can be described as extending from the western side of the Schuylkill River to the city line, with the northern border defined by the Philadelphia City Planning Commission as east from the city line along Baltimore Avenue moving south along 51st Street to Springfield Ave. It follows the train tracks until 49th Street. From 49th and Kingsessing Ave the line moves east along Kingsessing Ave. The line then moves south along 46th St to Paschall Ave where it jogs to join Grays Ferry where the line runs to the Schuylkill River.

West Philadelphia

West Philadelphia, nicknamed West Philly, is a section of Philadelphia. Though there is no official definition of its boundaries, it is generally considered to reach from the western shore of the Schuylkill River, to City Line Avenue to the northwest, Cobbs Creek to the southwest and the SEPTA Media/Wawa Line to the south.

Lower North Philadelphia

Lower North Philadelphia is a section of Philadelphia that is immediately north of Center City and below Upper North Philadelphia and can be described as a section of Philadelphia that was designated as a "Model City" target, in hopes of overcoming poverty and blight through a federal funding program since 1966. Bounded by Spring Garden Street to the south, Front Street to the east, York Street to the north and Fairmount Park to the west.

Upper North Philadelphia

The area is bounded by York Street to the south, Front Street to the east, Lincoln Highway/Roosevelt Expressway to the north, and Ridge Avenue/Fairmount Park to the west. Upper North Philadelphia, is a section of Philadelphia that is immediately north of Lower North Philadelphia and can be described as an area that has a "...large and rapidly growing Puerto Rican population".  The list of communities in this section is as follows:

Roxborough-Manayunk

The Roxborough-Manyunk section of Philadelphia is an official planning district of the Philadelphia City Planning Commission, consisting of the namesake boroughs of Roxborough and Manayunk.  Geographically, the area is northwest of Center City.

Germantown-Chestnut Hill

The Germantown-Chestnut Hill section of Philadelphia is about 7–8 miles northwest from the center of the city. The neighborhood of Germantown is rich in historic sites and buildings from the colonial era, a few of which are open to the public.  Its namesake also comes from the village of Chestnut Hill was part of the German Township laid out by Francis Daniel Pastorius and came to include the settlements originally known as Sommerhausen and Crefeld, as well as part of Cresheim.  The area generally served as a gateway between Philadelphia and the nearby farmlands. During the American Revolutionary War era (late 18th century), the area was one of many summer vacation spots due to its higher elevation, 400–500 feet (120 to 150 m) above sea level, and cooler temperatures than the historic Center City. Chestnut Hill is still stereotypically known as one of the more affluent sections of Philadelphia.

Olney-Oak Lane

The Olney-Oak Lane Planning Analysis Section is an official section of Philadelphia. It is a section of Philadelphia that is immediately north of Upper North Philadelphia and south of Cheltenham. It is an area that consists of the now defunct township that was called "Bristol Township, Philadelphia County, Pennsylvania". The section is often included as part of North Philadelphia by city government agencies, though locally it is often referred to as "Uptown," along with the Germantown-Chestnut Hill section.

The section includes neighborhoods in the center-north of the city:

River Wards

The River Wards section of Philadelphia is located to the northeast of Center City, along the Delaware River.

Neighborhoods within the River Wards include:

Near Northeast Philadelphia

Near Northeast Philadelphia, is a section of the city of Philadelphia.
When combined with the Far Northeast, to be "Northeast Philadelphia", the 2000 Census shows that the combined area has a sizable percentage of the city's 1.547 million people — a population of between 300,000 and 450,000, depending on how the area is defined. Beginning in the 1980s, many of the Northeast's middle class children graduated from college and settled in suburbs, especially nearby Bucks County. An influx of Hispanics has occurred in the Northeast, while African Americans and Asian immigrants have purchased homes in Northeast Philadelphia. The Northeast is now both racially and ethnically diverse and has a large immigrant population.

Far Northeast Philadelphia

Far Northeast Philadelphia is an official planning section of Philadelphia that is north of the Near Northeast section of Philadelphia.

References

 
 Philadelphia Neighborhoods and Place Names—A list adapted and expanded from Finkel 1995:156-170 by the Philadelphia City Archives staff

External links

 Philadelphia Neighborhoods and Place Names
 Philadelphia neighborhoods: data and interactive map.
 
 
 

 
Philadelphia
Neighborhoods